Wichmann is a bowl-shaped lunar impact crater. It was named after German astronomer Moritz L. G. Wichmann. It is located in the southern half of Oceanus Procellarum on a low plateau formed from a wrinkle ridge, Dorsa Ewing. 

There is a small mountain chain to the north that curves away to the west that is designated Wichmann R; this is most likely the rim of a worn crater that was buried by the lava flow forming the mare. Additional low mountains lie to the south of the plateau on which Wichmann is situated.

Satellite craters
By convention these features are identified on lunar maps by placing the letter on the side of the crater midpoint that is closest to Wichmann.

Gallery

References

 
 
 
 
 
 
 
 
 
 
 

Impact craters on the Moon